Harvey Arthur Darvill (7 April 1896 – 1924) was an English footballer who played in the Football League for Fulham.

References

1896 births
1924 deaths
English footballers
Association football forwards
English Football League players
Ilford F.C. players
Fulham F.C. players